Palazzo Doria may refer to a number of historical palaces and villas which belonged or still belong to the Doria family (Ligurian: Döia), originally De Auria (Latin: de filiis Auriae; 'the sons of Auria'), an old and extremely wealthy Genoese family who played a major role in the history of the Republic of Genoa and in Italy, from the 12th century to the 16th century.
 
 Palazzo Doria, Palazzo dei Rolli in the historical center of Genoa, included in the World Heritage Site Genoa: Le Strade Nuove and the system of the Palazzi dei Rolli
 Palazzo Doria d'Angri, palace in the historical center of Naples
 Palazzo Doria Pamphili, palace in the historical center of Rome
 Palazzo Doria Spinola, Palazzo dei Rolli in the historical center of Genoa, included in the World Heritage Site Genoa: Le Strade Nuove and the system of the Palazzi dei Rolli

See also 
 Doria (family)